The 2005 UNCAF Interclub Cup was the 23rd edition of the international club football competition held in the UNCAF region representing the seven nations of Central America. This was the seventh year of the current format using the name UNCAF Interclub Cup.  The tournament was also a qualifying event for the 2006 CONCACAF Champions' Cup.  Sixteen teams representing seven football associations took part, starting with the first qualifying games on July 26, 2005. The tournament ended with a two-legged final between Olimpia of Honduras and Alajuelense of Costa Rica. The first leg was played in  Tegucigalpa, Honduras on November 23, 2005 and ended with Alajuelense earning a 1-0 victory. The second leg was played in  Alajuela, Costa Rica on November 30, 2005 with Olimpia winning 1-0. Alajuelense then won the UNCAF Interclub Cup in a penalty shootout by the score of 4-2.  The top three finishers in the tournament, Alajuelense, Olimpia, and Saprissa, qualified for the 2006 CONCACAF Champions' Cup.

Bracket

Round of 16

 Parmalat were dissolved prior the start of the tournament and Marathón advanced automatically.

Quarterfinals

Semifinals

Third place

Final

Alajuelense 2005 UNCAF champions

Alajuelense, Olimpia, Deportivo Saprissa advance to 2006 CONCACAF Champions' Cup quarterfinals.

References

UNCAF Interclub Cup
1
2005–06 in Honduran football
2005–06 in Guatemalan football
2005–06 in Costa Rican football
2005–06 in Salvadoran football
2005–06 in Nicaraguan football
2005–06 in Belizean football
2005–06 in Panamanian football